So Long Davey!, was an American alternative rock band that started in San Diego, California. In 2012, So Long Davey! provided the soundtrack for the first full-length Sony PlayStation Home video game, Emo Ray VS The Intergalactic Teddy Bears. The band had self-released two extended play albums and one full-length album entitled The Real Houseboys of Beverly Hills before disbanding in August 2013.

Early career 

So Long Davey! was formed in 2007 by friends singer David Vaughn and guitarist James Austin in San Diego, California. Both musicians were classically trained but decided to perform rock music in dedication to their favorite bands and music acts. The first gigs were performed in an all ages San Diego music venue SOMA. The band was a crowd favorite and earned spots opening for Sum 41, Plain White T's, and Say Anything.

In March 2008, So Long Davey! released their debut CD entitled Another Planet. The EP contained 4 songs including the title track and another crowd favorite, "You Got Me". The band received promotion in local publications and online social media that promoted their first release. In 2009, the band was selected to play the Kevin Says Stage on Vans Warped Tour.

2009–2011: The Fashion 

In 2009, So Long Davey! began recording their second EP, The Fashion in Los Angeles, California. In March 2010, the album was released gaining the attention from writers at MTV Buzzworthy who posted a blog about the band. In 2011, So Long Davey! was invited again to play Vans Warped Tour this time on the Ernie Ball Stage.

2012–2013: The Real Houseboys of Beverly Hills 

So Long Davey! released their eponymous full-length album, The Real Houseboys of Beverly Hills on October 2, 2012. The album was produced by Kyle Black who had previously worked with popular rock bands Paramore, Neon Trees, and All Time Low and was mastered by Euphonic Mastering which is known for work with Maroon 5. The leading with the single for the album was "Making Out" in 2012, followed by "6AM (In My Room)" and "Silver Bullet" in 2013. In November 2012, So Long Davey provided the soundtrack for the Sony PlayStation 3 first full-length video game for PlayStation Home entitled Emo Ray VS The Intergalactic Teddy Bears. Songs from The Real Houseboys... were primarily used as part of the soundtrack.

Discography

Another Planet (2008)

Another Planet
You Got Me
The Doctor Said I'll Outgrow This
Any Moment Now (acoustic)

The Fashion (2010)

Love Hurts
Wallflowers in Bloom
Six Feet Down
Magazines

The Real Houseboys of Beverly Hills (2012)

Making Out
The Real Houseboys of Beverly Hills
6AM (In My Room)
Jenny
Neil, You've Lost Your Touch
Change The World
Silver Bullet
Fever
Truth Or Dare
California Song

References

Alternative rock groups from California
Musical groups established in 2007